Bat-Erdene Mungunzul (born  in Orkhon, Mongolia) is a Mongolian chess player who won an individual gold medal in the 44th Chess Olympiad.

A native of the aimag of Orkhon, Mungunzul is a member of the Khangarid sports club in Orkhon's capital Erdenet.  She earned the FIDE title of Woman Candidate Master in 2014.

Early life and education 

Tsevelmaa and N. Bat-Erdene, and is one of six children in her family. Her mother is originally from Tarialan sum in the aimag of Uvs.

Mungunzul began playing chess at the age of five.  Bat-Erdene had also played chess when he was a child, having learnt the game from his aunt, so when Mungunzul came home from kindergarten one day stating that she wanted to go to the chess club, her dad taught her how to play the game.

Career 

In 2015, Mungunzul took part in the Asian Youth Chess Championship held in Suwon, South Korea, and won a silver medal in the under-10 girls division.

At the World Youth Chess Championship 2019 held in Mumbai, India, Mungunzul was initially the leader in the under-14 girls division, but was eventually defeated by Rakshitta Ravi.  Mungunzul ended the tournament in fourth place.

In 2022, at the 44th Chess Olympiad held in Chennai, India, Mungunzul won an individual gold medal on board four, finishing with a performance rating of 2460.

References

External links 
 
 
 
 

2005 births
Living people
21st-century Mongolian women
Chess Olympiad competitors
Mongolian female chess players